is a closing pitcher for the Tokyo Yakult Swallows in Nippon Professional Baseball. His uniform number is 29.

External links

1980 births
Japanese baseball coaches
Japanese baseball players
Living people
Nippon Professional Baseball coaches
Nippon Professional Baseball pitchers
Saitama Seibu Lions players
Seibu Lions players
Baseball people from Saitama Prefecture
Tokyo Yakult Swallows players